Boston Stores, originally and later still often called The Boston Store was a chain of department stores based in Inglewood, California, just southwest of Central Los Angeles, operating from 1934 through 1996. The chain grew to 20 stores by 1990, 14 in California and 6 in Arizona, with around 1,000 employees. By 1990 the headquarters had been relocated to Carson, around 13 miles south of Inglewood.

There have been dozens of stores called "Boston Store" in the U.S., including J. W. Robinson's which went by that name in the late 19th and early 20th century in its downtown Los Angeles locations, and two unrelated "Boston Stores"- on operating in 1925 at 320 S. Broadway in Downtown Los Angeles in the old Blackstone's Department Store building and another in 1939 with branches at 331 S. Broadway in the old Jacoby Bros. store and at 4755 Whittier Blvd. in East Los Angeles. Neither of them are related to the Inglewood-based Boston Stores.

Ira Kaufman started the chain with a single store in downtown Inglewood in 1934.

Other department stores acquired

Myers Whittier
Boston Stores acquired the Myers department store in Whittier in 1972, a company dating back to about 1905 when it started as the Myers Dry Goods Company. The Myers building had been opened in 1955. Initially Boston Stores kept the Myers name and branding, and opened a new store in Whittwood Center on May 2, 1974, under the Myers name. Branding of the two Whittier stores was changed to "Boston Stores" in 1976.

Wineman's

In 1984, Boston Stores acquired Wineman's department stores, with origins in Ventura and Oxnard but since 1924 a legendary anchor of the busy Pacific Boulevard shopping district in Huntington Park, the busiest in the southeastern Los Angeles suburbs from the 1930s through the 1950s. The company had had ambitious expansion plans in the early 1920s, but wound up retreating to a single location in Huntington Park by the late 1920s. In 1969, it embarked on expansion plans again, and in this era (1969–1983) expanded across Southern California.
Boston Stores converted several Wineman's branches to Boston Stores.
Monrovia ...  closed prior to Garden Grove and Corona, possibly even as early as the Mission Viejo store opening
Placentia, 110 E. Yorba Linda Blvd., opened October 19, 1973
 Mission Viejo... similar store to Placentia, opening a year or two later
Garden Grove at Garden Grove Mall, opened September 1, 1979.) Advertising for this location stopped shortly thereafter in 1980.
 Corona ... Opened at same time as Garden Grove as dual "grand openings" 

There is no record of the Huntington Park flagship ever having operated as a Boston Store.

Decline and liquidation
The chain had long promoted moderately-priced national brands such as Hart, Schaffner and Marx, as it promoted them: "quality leadership brands", with a philosophy of operating intimate, smaller stores of 10,000 to 20,000 square feet (though some were larger, like Rossmore), in neighborhood shopping centers and areas that were relatively far from, or otherwise underserved by malls and mainline department stores.

In 1984, Chairman Donald Kaufman led management in a leveraged buyout of his father, Ira. This, in addition to acquiring chains like Wineman's and Malcolms, and a new $1 million computerized inventory and cash register system, added greatly to the company's debt in the 1980s. In an interview with the Torrance Daily Breeze, Donald Kaufman admitted that the company lost a lot of money in 1985, though it was doing better in 1986. The chain closed some stores around this time, such as Orangefair in Fullerton and Crenshaw-Imperial Plaza in Inglewood.

In addition, by the mid-1980s, times were tough for the local junior department stores as larger malls had reached most areas of Greater Los Angeles. They had fewer nice markets, areas where they could do well.

In 1992, Boston Stores sought Chapter 11 bankruptcy protection. Some stores closed. 

Remaining stores were liquidated in 1996.

References

Defunct department stores based in Greater Los Angeles
Inglewood, California
Carson, California